Johan Larsson (born March 24, 1986) is a Swedish professional ice hockey defenceman who is currently playing with BIK Karlskoga in the HockeyAllsvenskan (Allsv).

Playing career 
Larsson began his career in 2005 with Bofors IK in the HockeyAllsvenskan. He played for Diables Rouges de Briançon in the Ligue Magnus in the 2008–09 season. In the 2010–11 HockeyAllsvenskan season, he scored 14 goals with Bofors, the best total of the season for a defenceman. In April 2011, he signed a two-year contract with reigning Swedish champions Färjestads BK of the Elitserien. Following stops included HV71 as well as Finnish clubs HPK, Tappara and SaiPa.

In October 2016, he was picked up by the Iserlohn Roosters of the Deutsche Eishockey Liga (DEL) in Germany. Larsson played two seasons in the DEL with the Roosters, before returning to Sweden as a free agent in signing a one-year contract with AIK IF of the Allsvenskan on July 10, 2018.

Career statistics

References

External links
 

1986 births
Living people
Swedish ice hockey defencemen
AIK IF players
Bofors IK players
Diables Rouges de Briançon players
Färjestad BK players
HPK players
HV71 players
Iserlohn Roosters players
SaiPa players
Tappara players
Swedish expatriate ice hockey players in Finland
Swedish expatriate ice hockey players in Germany
Swedish expatriate sportspeople in France
Expatriate ice hockey players in France